Sebewaing Township is a civil township of Huron County in the U.S. state of Michigan.  The population was 2,944 at the 2000 census, which ranks it as the most populous township in the county. The village of Sebewaing is located within the township. The township was organized in 1853.

Communities 
 The Village of Sebewaing is within the township.
 Bach is an unincorporated community on the Township's border with Brookfield Township at Bach and Bay Port Roads  with side streets (Liken and Bartholomy) in Sebewaing.

Geography
Its name derives from the Ojibwe word ziibiiweng meaning "by the stream."

Demographics
As of the census of 2000, there were 2,944 people, 1,252 households, and 832 families residing in the township. The racial makeup of the township was 98.61% White, 0.07% African American, 0.24% Native American, 0.14% Asian, 0.48% from other races, and 0.48% from two or more races. Hispanic or Latino of any race were 3.16% of the population.

There were 1,252 households, out of which 27.7% had children under the age of 18 living with them, 56.0% were married couples living together, 6.9% had a female householder with no husband present, and 33.5% were non-families. 31.2% of all households were made up of individuals, and 17.2% had someone living alone who was 65 years of age or older.  The average household size was 2.35 and the average family size was 2.94.

In the township the population was spread out, with 23.5% under the age of 18, 7.3% from 18 to 24, 26.1% from 25 to 44, 24.8% from 45 to 64, and 18.4% who were 65 years of age or older.  The median age was 41 years. For every 100 females, there were 90.8 males.  For every 100 females age 18 and over, there were 91.0 males.

The median income for a household in the township was $34,275, and the median income for a family was $42,383. Males had a median income of $31,882 versus $24,444 for females. The per capita income for the township was $17,787.  About 11.4% of families and 13.9% of the population were below the poverty line, including 24.0% of those under age 18 and 8.5% of those age 65 or over.

References

Notes

Sources

Townships in Huron County, Michigan
Populated places established in 1853
Townships in Michigan
Populated places on Lake Huron in the United States